Wolziger See is a lake in Heidesee, Brandenburg, Germany.

External links 

Lakes of Brandenburg
Dahme-Spreewald
Federal waterways in Germany
LWolzigerSee